Count Johan August Meijerfeldt (1725-1800) was a Swedish field marshal. To distinguish him from his father, Johan August Meijerfeldt the Elder, he is generally referred to as Johan August Meijerfeldt the Younger.

The Meijerfeldt family came from Livonia and Johan August Meijerfeldt the Younger entered Swedish service in 1751 as a major in the army. He served in the Pomeranian War and the Russo-Swedish War of 1788-1790. He made a successful career as an officer in the Swedish military; during the latter war he was promoted to field marshal and commander of the army. He died in 1800. He was the last male member of the Meijerfeldt family.

References

1725 births
1800 deaths
Swedish generals
Field marshals of Sweden
People of the Russo-Swedish War (1788–1790)